Maartmann is a surname. Notable people with the surname include:

 Harald Maartmann (1926–2021), Norwegian cross country skier
 Titti Maartmann (1920–2018), Norwegian luger
 Knud Geelmuyden Fleischer Maartmann (1821–1888), Norwegian politician
 Rolf Maartmann (1887–1941), Norwegian football player
 Erling Maartmann (1887–1944), Norwegian football player